This is a list of Billboard magazine's top popular songs of 1951 by retail sales.

See also
1951 in music
List of number-one singles of 1951 (U.S.)

References

1951 record charts
Billboard charts